2012 Final Four may refer to:
2012 NCAA Men's Division I Basketball Tournament
2012 NCAA Women's Division I Basketball Tournament
2012 Final Four (baseball)